Weiler-la-Tour is a commune and small town in southern Luxembourg. It is located south-east of Luxembourg City.  The commune's administrative centre is Hassel.

, the town of Weiler-la-Tour, which lies in the south of the commune, has a population of 477.  Other towns within the commune include Hassel and Syren.

Population

References

External links
 

Communes in Luxembourg (canton)
Towns in Luxembourg